"First Time" is a song by American singer Robin Beck from her second album, Trouble or Nothin' (1989). The song was released as a single in July 1988 and was originally recorded for a Coca-Cola commercial in 1987. In the United Kingdom, the power ballad climbed to  1 and spent three weeks there in November and December 1988, spending 14 weeks on the UK Singles Chart in total. The song additionally reached number one in Austria, Greece, Ireland, the Netherlands, Norway, Switzerland, and West Germany.

Critical reception
Bill Coleman from Billboard wrote, "Fledgling rock vixen takes another shot at radio approval with this well-sung power ballad."

Music video
There were two (completely different) professionally filmed music videos for the single. One is almost exclusively performance footage of Beck and her band, shot in a style used by many hair metal acts of the late 1980s. The other version is a "concept" video: At the beginning, Beck is seen in her bathroom, applying mascara and checking her hair, then makes a quick phone call. She goes through her apartment with scenes of her with her boyfriend. She looks out of a window before watching television (more scenes of her with her boyfriend). She flips through a magazine on the mantelpiece (more scenes), then makes another phone call. At the end of the video, the doorbell rings. Beck turns the television off and answers the door, but the person behind the door cannot be seen.

Track listings
7-inch single
 "First Time" – 3:17
 "First Time" (instrumental) – 3:18

12-inch and CD single
 "First Time" (remix) – 3:18
 "First Time" (7-inch version) – 3:17
 "First Time" (instrumental) – 3:18

Cassette single
 "First Time" – 3:18
 "Sleeping with the Enemy" – 3:35

Charts

Weekly charts

Year-end charts

Certifications

Cover versions
The song was covered in a Spanish version for the Latin American Coca-Cola campaign by Mexican singer Rocío Banquells, under the title Primera Vez, released on her album En El Alambre.

In 1999, Polish singer Kasia Kowalska recorded a Polish-language version of the song for the Polish Coca-Cola campaign, under the title "Chcę zatrzymać ten czas". Polish singer Margaret also recorded her version of the song for Polish Coca-Cola commercial titled "Smak radości". It was released for digital download on April 16, 2015.

Unique version
In 2003, the song was covered by Unique which achieved minor success in Switzerland.

Track listing
CD maxi
 "First Time" (radio edit djs@work RMX) — 3:12
 "First Time" (video mix free power mix) — 3:48
 "First Time" (club mix Patrick Bnton RMX) — 6:38
 "First Time" (Ibiza groove mix zero G RMX) — 5:48
 "First Time" (trance club mix Unique & toxic RMX) — 7:28
 "First Time" (extended mix djs@work RMX) — 6:52
 "First Time" (extended mix free power 4 hypnotic) — 6:35

Charts

Sunblock version
In 2006, Sunblock, an electronic music group from Sweden, recorded a cover of the song with Robin Beck for their second single. It became their second top-10 hit, charting at number nine on the UK Singles Chart.

Charts

See also
 I'd Like to Teach the World to Sing (In Perfect Harmony), which also came to prominence via a Coca-Cola TV commercial

References

1980s ballads
1988 singles
Robin Beck songs
Number-one singles in Austria
European Hot 100 Singles number-one singles
Margaret (singer) songs
Number-one singles in Germany
Number-one singles in Greece
Irish Singles Chart number-one singles
Dutch Top 40 number-one singles
Number-one singles in Norway
Number-one singles in Switzerland
UK Singles Chart number-one singles
1988 songs
Metronome Records singles
Mercury Records singles
Rock ballads
2015 singles
Songs used as jingles